The  or VVB is a part-independent Flemish-minded non-profit association. Since 1991, the VVB has been campaigning for the independence of Flanders and therefore belongs to the Flemish-nationalist movement within the Flemish Movement. The VVB maintains good contacts with most Flemish political parties. Its members come from all over the political spectrum. There are close structural ties with the Language Action Committee (T.A.K.) and the Flemish Committee for Brussels.

The VVB was founded in 1956 as an independent and pluralistic pressure group chaired by Maurits Coppieters, a notorious politician and anti-fascist Flemish nationalist. At a VVB congress in 1962, then-political secretary Wilfried Martens launched the idea of unionist federalism for then-unitary Belgium.

The VVB is one of the smaller social-cultural associations in Flanders. The Flemish People's Movement has a large number of local departments, a monthly magazine Onaf and specific workgroups. The VVB is officially recognised and therefore also subsidised by the Flemish Community as a socio-cultural association. Its goal is as follows: "The VVB aims to develop Flanders into an independent state through Dutch socio-cultural education work for adults. This includes studying all possible questions of a social, economic, financial, cultural and political nature, which are raised in connection with the full development of Flanders, socio-cultural training in connection with these problems and the information of public opinion in this area and all activities that can promote the resolution of these problems. The VVB is not a political party, but a pressure group that stands up for the general interest of the Flemish community. The VVB endorses the ECHR".

The current management rests with the board of directors, chairman Hugo Maes and director Hilde Roosens.

The VVB is campaigning for Flemish independence and against the Belgian democratic deficit and the still existing discriminations against the Flemish in the Belgian institutions and in Brussels.

The VVB is co-founder of EPI (European Partnership for Independence) and ICEC (International Commission of European Citizens). On 30 March 2014, the VVB organised a successful international demonstration for self-determination and independence in Brussels. The annual flagging of the Tour of Flanders in which some 70 000 lion flags are distributed among the viewers is the event in which the VVB manifests itself most clearly as the promoter of a Flemish identity.

References

External links 
 Vlaamse Volksbeweging Official Webpage
 Webpage of ICEC 
 Webpage of EPI 

Political and economic think tanks based in the European Union
Politics of Belgium
Think tanks based in Belgium
Flemish Movement